Holm may refer to:

Places  
 Holm (island), the name of several islands
 Holm, Nordfriesland, Germany
 Holm, Pinneberg, Germany
 Holm (Flensburg), Flensburg, Germany
 Holm, Norway, in Nordland county
 Holm, Troms, Norway
 Holm, Podu Iloaiei, Iași County, Romania
 Holm, Pâncești, Romania
 Holm, Inverness, Scotland
 Holm, Lewis, Scotland
 Holm, Orkney, Scotland
 Holm, Halmstad, Sweden
 Mount Saint Mary, formerly known as Holm, Slovenia
 Holm Land, King Frederick VIII Land, Greenland

Other
 Holm (surname)
 Holm & Co, former ship owners, ship brokers and stevedores based in Wellington, New Zealand
 Holm & Molzen, former  German company principally known for ship management between 1890 and 1932
 Holm Oak or Quercus ilex, a tree. Also found as a placename element in southern England such as Holmbush

See also 

 Holme (disambiguation)
 Holmen (disambiguation)
 Holmes (disambiguation)
 -hou, a place-name element